Leptoctenus is a genus of wandering spiders first described by L. Koch in 1878.

Species
 it contains six species:
Leptoctenus agalenoides L. Koch, 1878 (type) – Australia
Leptoctenus byrrhus Simon, 1888 – USA, Mexico
Leptoctenus daoxianensis Yin, Tang & Gong, 2000 – China
Leptoctenus gertschi Peck, 1981 – Mexico
Leptoctenus paradoxus (F. O. Pickard-Cambridge, 1900) – Panama
Leptoctenus sonoraensis Peck, 1981 – Mexico

References

External links
Leptoctenus at BugGuide

Araneomorphae genera
Ctenidae
Spiders of Asia
Spiders of Australia
Spiders of North America